Faunis canens, the common faun, is a butterfly from South and South East Asia that belongs to the Morphinae, a subfamily of the brush-footed butterflies. This species may include the Indian faun, Faunis arcesilaus.

The common faun ranges from Sikkim to Assam and Myanmar and through Thailand, peninsular Malaya, Singapore to southern Yunnan and the western islands of the Indonesian archipelago. The larva feeds on Musa.

Footnotes

References
 
 
 

Faunis
Butterflies of Asia
Butterflies of Singapore
Butterflies of Indochina
Taxa named by Jacob Hübner